To Russia with Love is a 1994 album by Mannheim Steamroller. The album was recorded in St. Petersburg's Philharmonia Hall.

Track listing
"The Goodwill Games" – 4:24
"Ruslan and Ljudmila" – 5:14
"Melodie" – 1:38
"Let's Go Home" – 1:04
"Dancing Flames" – 6:34
"Troika from Lieutenant Kizheh" – 2:51
"The Goose from Smolensk" – 2:04
"Chakra 3 (The 7 Chakras of the Body)" (originally recorded on Fresh Aire VII)– 3:20
"The Smolny Fanfare" – :29
"The Marche Miniature" – 2:17
"Fugue" (originally recorded on Chip Davis' Impressions) – 4:15
"Bird in the Garden" – 2:25
"The Great Gate of Kiev" – 6:02
"The Anthems" – 3:26

References

1994 albums
Mannheim Steamroller albums
American Gramaphone albums